The West Coast Eagles are an Australian rules football team based in Perth, Western Australia. Their 2018 season was their 32nd season in the Australian Football League (AFL), their fifth season under coach Adam Simpson, and their fourth season with Shannon Hurn as captain. The West Coast Eagles finished the season with 16 wins and 6 losses, placing them second on the ladder, qualifying for the 2018 AFL finals series. They would go on to win the Grand Final by 5 points against .

Background

The West Coast Eagles are an Australian rules football team based in Perth, Western Australia, that competes in the Australian Football League (AFL). They finished the 2017 home-and-away season eighth on the ladder. The were eliminated in the semi finals.

Shannon Hurn was the team's captain in 2018 for a fourth consecutive year. Adam Simpson was the team's senior coach.

West Coast had 80,290 members in 2018, a 23.40% increase on 2017 numbers.

Playing list

2017 off-season changes

Statistics

Season summary
West Coast started the 2018 season by facing  in the first AFL match at the newly opened Perth Stadium (known under sponsorship as Optus Stadium). The Eagles lost that match by 29 points. West Coast would then go on to win their next 10 matches, the most notable of which was against  at Optus Stadium in round 9. Richmond were the reigning premiers, and ladder leaders at the time, having lost just one game, and were ahead of West Coast on the ladder by percentage only. The Eagles managed to win that game by 47 points, putting West Coast first on the ladder and in serious contention for the premiership.

West Coast broke their streak of bad games by beating  in round 16. During the Derby, Eagles midfielder Andrew Gaff made an unprovoked and off-the-ball punch on Fremantle's Andrew Brayshaw, breaking his jaw. Gaff was criticised for this on social media and figures in the AFL world. Gaff received an eight match suspension for this punch.

The following week after the Western Derby, West Coast beat  after Jeremy McGovern kicked a goal after the siren. West Coast did not have the lead at any point during the match, and came from four goals down to win the game. This was the second time in a year within a year that West Coast beat Port Adelaide with a goal after the siren, the first being an elimination final in 2017. At the end of the season, West Coast were second on the ladder, only behind Richmond. This qualified West Coast to have two home finals.

Their first final was a qualifying final against Collingwood. The Eagles came from 10 points down at three quarter time to win by 16 points. This sent West Coast into a preliminary final two weeks later against Melbourne. In the match, West Coast thrashed Melbourne by 66 points. In the first half, Melbourne scored no goals, the first time this happened in a final since 1927. This win sent West Coast into the 2018 AFL Grand Final against Collingwood at the Melbourne Cricket Ground.

In the first quarter of the grand final, West Coast trailed by as much as 29 points, as Collingwood kicked the opening five goals. From there, the Eagles clawed back the margin back to zero by three quarter time. In the final quarter, the Magpies kicked two early goals, leaving much of the rest of the quarter for the Eagles to be trailing. With two minutes remaining, and West Coast two points down, Dom Sheed kicked the winning goal from the boundary. The Grand Final finished with West Coast winning their fourth AFL premiership.

Results

Ladder

Awards
West Coast had four players in the 2018 All-Australian team. They were Andrew Gaff, Shannon Hurn, Jeremy McGovern and Elliot Yeo.

References

West Coast Eagles seasons
2018 Australian Football League season